Robert Stanley Wilson (born 1 October 1948) is a New Zealand former cricketer. He played two first-class matches for Otago between 1971 and 1979.

See also
 List of Otago representative cricketers

References

External links
 

1948 births
Living people
New Zealand cricketers
Otago cricketers
Sportspeople from Balclutha, New Zealand